Encanto is the thirty-sixth studio album by Brazilian musician Sérgio Mendes.  It is his second work in collaboration with The Black Eyed Peas.

Track listing

Charts

Release history

References

External links
Sérgio Mendes interview by Pete Lewis, 'Blues & Soul' July 2008

2008 albums
Sérgio Mendes albums
Albums produced by will.i.am
Albums produced by Sérgio Mendes